Birds in the Bush (also known as The Virgin Fellas and Strike It Rich) is an Australian/United Kingdom situation comedy series produced in 1972.

The series was set on a remote Australian property run by seven beautiful but naive young women. When the property is inherited by an English water diviner (Hugh Lloyd) he and his Australian half-brother (Ron Frazer) and an assistant (Kate Fitzpatrick) begin living on the property and attempt to teach the nubile young women the ways of the world.

The series focused on the physical attractiveness of the young women, who all wore skimpy blue smocks and had names like "Abigail", "Lolita", "Tuesday", "Wednesday" and "Buster", along with Carry On-style innuendo.

Production

The series was written and directed by David Croft and was intended primarily for a UK audience. As UK television was by now broadcasting in colour, it meant that Birds in the Bush was also shot in colour, but this necessitated shooting the series on film rather than videotape, as the ATN7 television studios in Australia were yet to be converted to colour.

Reaction

The series began on air in Australia on 3 May 1972 but rated poorly there. Likewise UK ratings were low and the series run was cancelled there before all the episodes had been shown (it ran on BBC1 from 10 July 1972 until 21 August 1972). Just one season of 13 30-minute episodes was produced.

Cast member Kate Sheil, who played one of the naive girls, later said of her participation in the series that "I'm still trying to live that down because a lot of people hated it. We just run around saying these amazing things. I used to watch it for the scenery".

Cast
 Hugh Lloyd as Hugh
 Ron Frazer as Ron
 Alastair Duncan as Hoffnung
 Kate Fitzpatrick as Michelle
 Elli Maclure as Abigail
 Ann Sidney as Nanny
 Susan Lloyd as Lolita
 Kate Sheil as Friday
 Briony Behets as Tuesday
 Nicola Flamer as Caldera as Wednesday
 Jenny Hayes as Buster

References

External links
 Comedy Guide

BBC television sitcoms
David Croft sitcoms
Australian television sitcoms
1970s British sitcoms
1972 British television series debuts
1972 British television series endings
1972 Australian television series debuts
1972 Australian television series endings
English-language television shows
Black-and-white Australian television shows